Lena Birgitta Hjelm-Wallén (born 14 January 1943) is a Swedish politician. In 1968 Hjelm-Wallén became a member of the Swedish Parliament (Riksdag) and she held several cabinet positions, starting in 1974 as the youngest minister to that date. A member of the Social Democratic party, she served as Minister for Education from 1982 to 1985, as Minister for Foreign Affairs from 1994 to 1998 and as Deputy Prime Minister from 1995 to 2002.
 
She has served as Chair of the governing Board of the International Institute for Democracy and Electoral Assistance (IDEA), an intergovernmental organisation with 25 member states whose objective is supporting sustainable democratic change worldwide.

References

External links
Lena Hjelm-Wallen at the Riksdag website

|-

|-

|-

|-

|-

|-

|-

|-

1943 births
Living people
People from Sala Municipality
Recipients of the Order of the Cross of Terra Mariana, 1st Class
Swedish Ministers for Foreign Affairs
Swedish Ministers for International Development Cooperation
Members of the Riksdag from the Social Democrats
Women government ministers of Sweden
Female defence ministers
Female foreign ministers
Uppsala University alumni
20th-century Swedish women politicians
20th-century Swedish politicians
21st-century Swedish women politicians
Female justice ministers
Swedish women diplomats
20th-century Swedish women
Swedish Ministers for Education